OK Omens is a wine bar and restaurant in Portland, Oregon.

Description 
OK Omens, located in southeast Portland's Hosford-Abernethy neighborhood, has been described as a sibling restaurant to Castagna. The menu has included burgers, duck leg, grilled squid, and oysters.

History 
The restaurant opened in June 2018, replacing Cafe Castagna. OK Omens has hosted a late night happy hour, and had covered and heated outdoor seating during the COVID-19 pandemic.

Reception 

Michael Russell included OK Omens in The Oregonian'''s list of "Portland's 10 best new restaurants of 2018". In 2019, the business was included in Wine Enthusiast's list of "America's 100 Best Wine Restaurants" and Willamette Week's list of "The Top Five Restaurants for a Last-Minute Valentine’s Day Dinner".

Lonely Planet says, "OK Omens is a hit, not least for its epic wine list and menu of adventurous shareable dishes. Crowd favorites include a spicy Caesar-style salad with buttermilk fried chicken, hoisin-roasted carrots, adorable cheddar-filled beignets, crab pasta topped with thinly sliced jalapeños, and burgers." The website warns, "One caveat: noise level in the space can be deafening, so plan to sit close to your dinner date, or sit outdoors in warm weather."

 See also 

 List of New American restaurants

 References 

 External links 

 
 
 OK Omens at Condé Nast Traveler''

2018 establishments in Oregon
Drinking establishments in Oregon
Hosford-Abernethy, Portland, Oregon
New American restaurants in Portland, Oregon
Restaurants established in 2018
Wine bars